The Queensland Literary Awards is an awards program established in 2012 by the Queensland literary community, funded by sponsors and administered by the State Library of Queensland. Like the former Queensland Premier's Literary Awards, the QLAs celebrate and promote outstanding Australian writing. The awards aim to seek out, recognize and nurture great talent in Australian writing. They draw national and international attention to some of our best writers and to Queensland's recognition of outstanding Australian literature and publishing.

These Awards have a focus on supporting new writing through the Emerging Queensland Writer – Manuscript Award and Unpublished Indigenous writer – David Unaipon Award. "They give local writers and new writers something to aspire to."

History
The Queensland Literary Awards was established by a not-for-profit association of passionate Queensland volunteers and advocates for literature, in response to Queensland Premier Campbell Newman disestablishing the Queensland Premier's Literary Awards in 2012.

In 2012 and 2013 the program was run by a volunteer workforce. Following consultation with the QLA Inc. governing committee, 2014 saw the management of the QLA transition to State Library of Queensland (SLQ). While SLQ took on a leadership role in delivering the program, the aim was to continue to build on the existing collaborative model where the community and writing sector partners are key stakeholders.

The original Premier's awards were established by Peter Beattie, the then Premier of Queensland in 1998 and first awarded in 1999.

Award categories
There are currently twelve award categories including:
Queensland Premier's Award for a work of State Significance
Queensland Premier's Young Publishers and Writers Award 
Queensland Writers Fellowships
The University of Queensland Fiction Book Award
The University of Queensland Non-Fiction Book Award
Griffith University Young Adult Book Award
Griffith University Children's Book Award
University of Southern Queensland Steele Rudd Award for a Short Story Collection 
Judith Wright Calanthe Award for a Poetry Collection 
David Unaipon Award for an Emerging Aboriginal and/or Torres Strait Writer
Glendower Award for an Emerging Queensland Writer 
The Courier-Mail People's Choice Queensland Book of the Year

Judging
The Awards are judged by independent panels of writers, critics, journalists, academics and booksellers. The Awards are presented to works the judges determine possess the highest literary merit.

Winners

2022 
The winners were announced on 8 September 2022:

 Queensland Premier's Award for a work of State Significance – Wounded Country: The Murray-Darling Basin – a contested history by Quentin Beresford
 The Courier-Mail People's Choice Queensland Book of the Year Award – Another Day in the Colony by Chelsea Watego
 The University of Queensland Fiction Book Award –  The Other Half of You by Michael Mohammed Ahmad
 The University of Queensland Non-Fiction Book Award – Lies, Damned Lies by Claire G. Coleman
 Judith Wright Calanthe Award for a Poetry Collection – Stasis Shuffle by Pam Brown
 University of Southern Queensland Steele Rudd Award for a Short Story Collection –  Dark as Last Night by Tony Birch
 Griffith University Young Adult Book Award – Girls in Boys’ Cars by Felicity Castagna
 Children's Book Award – Kunyi written and illustrated by Kunyi June Anne McInerney
 Queensland Premier's Young Publishers and Writers Award –
 Rebecca Cheers
 Marilena Hewitt
 Queensland Writers Fellowships –
 Melissa Ashley
 Geneve Flynn
 Mary-Rose MacColl
 Glendower Award for Emerging Queensland Author – Yen-Rong Wong, "Things Left Unsaid"
 David Unaipon Award for an Emerging Aboriginal and/or Torres Strait Writer – Mykaela Saunders for "Always Will Be – stories of Goori sovereignty, from the future(s) of the Tweed"

2021 
The winners were announced on 9 September 2021:

 Queensland Premier's Award for a work of State Significance – Biting the Clouds: A Badtjala perspective on the Aboriginals Protection and Restriction of the Sale of Opium Act, 1897 by Fiona Foley
 The Courier-Mail People's Choice Queensland Book of the Year Award – Mary’s Last Dance: The untold story of the wife of Mao’s Last Dancer by Mary Li
 The University of Queensland Fiction Book Award – Song of the Crocodile by Nardi Simpson
 The University of Queensland Non-Fiction Book Award – Amnesia Road: Landscape, violence and memory by Luke Stegemann
 Judith Wright Calanthe Award for a Poetry Collection – Terminally Poetic by Ouyang Yu
 University of Southern Queensland Steele Rudd Award for a Short Story Collection – Ordinary Matter by Laura Elvery
 Griffith University Young Adult Book Award – Metal Fish, Falling Snow by Cath Moore
 Griffith University Children's Book Award – Bindi written by Kirli Saunders and illustrated by Dub Leffler
 Queensland Premier's Young Publishers and Writers Award – 
 Allanah Hunt
 Ellen Wengert
 Queensland Writers Fellowships – 
 Tabitha Bird for "The Healing Giggle of Wonder"
 Ella Jeffery for "Split Level"
 Kali Napier for "Preserving: Stories"
 Glendower Award for Emerging Queensland Author – Siang Lu, "The Whitewash"
 David Unaipon Award for an Emerging Aboriginal and/or Torres Strait Writer – Ngankiburka-mekauwe (Senior Woman of Water) Georgina Williams for "Mekauwe=Tears Volume #1 Poems (Notes For Song) 1970–2020"

2020 
The winners were announced on 4 September 2020:

 Queensland Premier's Award for a work of State Significance – Heartland: How Rugby League Explains Queensland, Joe Gorman
 The Courier-Mail People's Choice Queensland Book of the Year Award – A Lifetime of Impossible Days by Tabitha Bird
 The University of Queensland Fiction Book Award – Stone Sky Gold Mountain, Mirandi Riwoe
 The University of Queensland Non-Fiction Book Award – Olive Cotton: A Life in Photography, Helen Ennis
 Judith Wright Calanthe Award for a Poetry Collection – Heide, П. O.
 University of Southern Queensland Steele Rudd Award for a Short Story Collection – Lucky Ticket, Joey Bui
 Griffith University Young Adult Book Award – Ghost Bird, Lisa Fuller
 Griffith University Children's Book Award – As Fast As I Can, Penny Tangey
 Queensland Premier's Young Publishers and Writers Award – Zenobia Frost and Yen-Rong Wong
 Queensland Writers Fellowships – Sara El Sayed, Anna Jacobson and Amanda Niehaus
 Glendower Award for Emerging Queensland Author – If You're Happy, Fiona Robertson
 David Unaipon Award for an Emerging Aboriginal and/or Torres Strait Writer – The Space Between the Paperbark, Jazz Money

2019 
The winners were announced on 12 November 2019:

 Queensland Premier's Award for a work of State Significance – Too Much Lip, Melissa Lucashenko
 The Courier-Mail People's Choice Queensland Book of the Year Award – Adani, Following Its Dirty Footsteps: A Personal Story, Lindsay Simpson
 University of Queensland Fiction Book Award – Exploded View, Carrie Tiffany
 University of Queensland Non-Fiction Book Award – An Unconventional Wife: The Life of Julia Sorell Arnold, Mary Hoban
 University of Southern Queensland History Book Award – An Unconventional Wife: The Life of Julia Sorell Arnold, Mary Hoban
 State Library of Queensland Poetry Collection – Judith Wright Calanthe Award – Blakwork, Alison Whittaker
 University of Southern Queensland Australian Short Story Collection – Steele Rudd Award – Zebra: And Other Stories, Debra Adelaide 
 Griffith University Young Adult Book Award – Lenny’s Book of Everything, Karen Foxlee
 Griffith University Children's Book Award – The Slightly Alarming Tale of the Whispering Wars, Jaclyn Moriarty
 Queensland Premier's Young Publishers and Writers Awards – Ella Jeffery and Ellen van Neerven
 Queensland Writers Fellowships – Claire Christian, Sarah Holland-Batt and Emily O'Grady
 Glendower Award for Emerging Queensland Author for unpublished manuscript – Henry Hamlet’s Heart by Rhiannon Ratcliffe Wilde
 Unpublished Indigenous Writer – David Unaipon Award – Not awarded in 2019
 QUT Digital Literature Award – V[R]ignettes, Mez Breeze

2018 
The 2018 winners were:

 Queensland Premier's Award for a work of State Significance – We'll Show the World: Expo 88, Jackie Ryan
 The Courier Mail People's Choice Queensland Book of the Year Award – Brisbane Houses with Gardens, Beth Wilson
 University of Queensland Fiction Book Award – Taboo, Kim Scott
 University of Queensland Non-Fiction Book Award – Tracker, Alexis Wright
 University of Southern Queensland History Book Award – We'll Show the World: Expo 88, Jackie Ryan
 State Library of Queensland Poetry Collection – Judith Wright Calanthe Award – I Love Poetry, Michael Farrell
 University of Southern Queensland Australian Short Story Collection – Steele Rudd Award – Pulse Points, Jennifer Down
 Griffith University Young Adult Book Award – In the Dark Spaces, Cally Black
 Griffith University Children's Book Award – The Elephant, Peter Carnavas
 Queensland Premier's Young Publishers and Writers Awards – Anna Jacobson & Bri Lee
 Queensland Writers Fellowships – Michael Gerard Bauer, Jackie Ryan and Laura Elvery
 Glendower Award for Emerging Queensland Author for unpublished manuscript – Garrison Town, Melanie Myers
 Unpublished Indigenous Writer – David Unaipon Award – The Making of Ruby Champion, Kirstie Parker
 QUT Digital Literature Award – Little Emperor Syndrome, David Thomas Henry Wright, with Chris Arnold

2017 
The 2017 winners were:
 Queensland Premier's Award for a work of State Significance – The Daintree Blockade: The Battle for Australia's Tropical Rainforests, Bill Wilkie
 The Courier Mail People's Choice Queensland Book of the Year Award – Saltwater, Cathy McLennan
 University of Queensland Fiction Book Award – The Birdman's Wife, Melissa Ashley
 University of Queensland Non-Fiction Book Award – Saltwater, Cathy McLennan
 University of Southern Queensland History Book Award – Into the Heart of Tasmania: A Search for Human Antiquity, Rebe Taylor
 State Library of Queensland Poetry Collection – Judith Wright Calanthe Award – Fragments, Antigone Kefala
 University of Southern Queensland Australian Short Story Collection – Steele Rudd Award – The Circle and the Equator, Kyra Giorgi
 Griffith University Young Adult Book Award – Words in Deep Blue, Cath Crowley
 Griffith University Children's Book Award – The Grand, Genius Summer of Henry Hoobler, Lisa Shanahan
 Queensland Premier's Young Publishers and Writers Awards – Lech Blaine and Mindy Gill
 Queensland Writers Fellowships – Mirandi Riwoe, Zenobia Frost and Linda Neil
 Emerging Queensland Author – Manuscript Award – The Killing of Louisa, Janet Lee 
 Unpublished Indigenous Writer – David Unaipon Award – Mirrored Pieces, Lisa Fuller
 QUT Digital Literature Award – Nine Billion Branches, Jason Nelson

2016 
The 2016 winners were:
 Queensland Premier's Award for a work of State Significance – Not Just Black and White, Lesley and Tammy Williams
 The Courier Mail People's Choice Queensland Book of the Year Award – Swimming Home, Mary-Rose MacColl
 University of Queensland Fiction Book Award – Between a Wolf and a Dog, Georgia Blain
 University of Queensland Non-Fiction Book Award – Small Acts of Disappearance: Essays on Hunger, Fiona Wright
 University of Southern Queensland History Book Award – The Pearl Frontier: Indonesian Labour and Indigenous Encounters in Australia’s Northern Trading Network, Julia Martínez and Adrian Vickers
 State Library of Queensland Poetry Collection – Judith Wright Calanthe Award – Anatomy of Voice, David Musgrave
 University of Southern Queensland Australian Short Story Collection – Steele Rudd Award – co-winners: A Few Days in the Country and other stories, Elizabeth Harrower and The High Places, Fiona McFarlane
 Griffith University Young Adult Book Award – Dreaming the Enemy, David Metzenthen
 Griffith University Children's Book Award – KidGlovz, Julie Hunt (author) and Dale Newman (illustrator)
 Queensland Premier's Young Publishers and Writers Awards – Emily Craven and Michelle Law
 Emerging Queensland Author – Manuscript Award – No winner, two Encouragement Awards given – The Boatman, H.E. Crampton; and The Elements, Laura Elvery 
 Unpublished Indigenous Writer – David Unaipon Award – Dancing Home, Paul Collis

2015 
The 2015 winners were:
 Queensland Premier's Award for a work of State Significance – Warrior, Libby Connors
 The Courier Mail People's Choice Queensland Book of the Year Award – On the road...with the kids, John Ahern
 University of Queensland Fiction Book Award – The Golden Age, Joan London
 University of Queensland Non-Fiction Book Award – The Bush : Travels in the Heart of Australia, Don Watson
 University of Southern Queensland History Book Award – ANZAC, The Unauthorised Biography, Carolyn Holbrook
 State Library of Queensland Poetry Collection – Judith Wright Calanthe Award – Waiting for the Past, Les Murray
 Australian Short Story Collection – Steele Rudd Award – Merciless Gods, Christos Tsiolkas
 Griffith University Young Adult Book Award – The Pause, John Larkin
 Children's Book Award – A Single Stone, Meg McKinlay
 Queensland Premier's Young Publishers and Writers Awards – Megan McGrath and Rebecca Jessen
 Emerging Queensland Author – Manuscript Award – Aurora, Elizabeth Kasmer
 Unpublished Indigenous Writer – David Unaipon Award – The First Octoroon or Report of an Experimental Child, Andrew Booth

2014 
The 2014 winners were:
 The Courier Mail People's Choice Queensland Book of the Year Award – How to do a Liver Transplant: Stories from my Surgical Life, Kellee Slater
 University of Queensland Fiction Book Award – The Narrow Road to the Deep North, Richard Flanagan
 University of Queensland Non-Fiction Book Award – 1914: The Year the World Ended, Paul Ham
 University of Southern Queensland History Book Award – Broken Nation, Joan Beaumont
 State Library of Queensland Poetry Collection – Judith Wright Calanthe Award – Earth Hour, David Malouf
 Australian Short Story Collection – Steele Rudd Award – Only the Animals, Ceridwen Dovey
 Griffith University Young Adult Book Award – The Cracks in the Kingdom, Jaclyn Moriarty
 Children's Book Award – Refuge, Jackie French and Rules of Summer, Shaun Tan (joint winners)
 Emerging Queensland Author – Manuscript Award – We Come From Saltwater People, Cathy McLennan
 Unpublished Indigenous Writer – David Unaipon Award – It’s Not Just Black and White, Lesley & Tammy Williams

2013 
The 2013 winners were:
 The Courier Mail People's Choice Queensland Book of the Year Award – The Secret Keeper, Kate Morton
 Deloitte Fiction Book Award – Mullumbimby, Melissa Lucashenko
 University of Queensland Non-Fiction Book Award – Boy, Lost, Kristina Olsson
 University of Southern Queensland History Book Award – The Flash of Recognition, Jane Lydon
 State Library of Queensland Poetry Collection – Judith Wright Calanthe Award – Jam Tree Gully, John Kinsella
 Australian Short Story Collection – Steele Rudd Award – Like a House on Fire, Cate Kennedy
 Griffith University Young Adult Book Award – A Corner of White, Jaclyn Moriarty
 Children's Book Award – Don't Let a Spoonbill in the Kitchen!, Narelle Oliver
 Gadens Feature Film Script Award – Healing, Craig Monahan and Alison Nisselle
 Emerging Queensland Author – Manuscript Award – Gap, Rebecca Jessen
 Unpublished Indigenous Writer – David Unaipon Award – Heat and Light, Ellen van Neerven

2012 
The 2012 winners were:
 Fiction Book Award – Cold Light, Frank Moorhouse
 Non-Fiction Book Award – The People Smuggler, Robin De Crespigny
 History Book Award – The Biggest Estate on Earth: How Aborigines Made Australia, Bill Gammage
 Literary or Media Work Advancing Public Debate – Harry Williams Award – The Australian Moment: How We Were Made For These Times, George Megalogenis
 Science Writers Award – Sex, Genes & Rock 'n' Roll, Rob Brooks
 Poetry Collection – Judith Wright Calanthe Award – Crimson Crop, Peter Rose
 Australian Short Story Collection – Steele Rudd Award – Turbulence, Janette Turner Hospital
 Young Adult Book Award – The Ink Bridge, Neil Grant
 Children's Book Award – Kumiko and the Shadow Catchers, Briony Stewart
 Film Script Award – Dead Europe, Louise Fox
 Emerging Queensland Author – Manuscript Award – Island of the Unexpected, Catherine Titasey
 Unpublished Indigenous Writer – David Unaipon Award – Story, Siv Parker
 Drama Script (Stage) Award – War Crimes, Angela Betzien
 Television Script Award – Mabo, Sue Smith

References

External links

Australian fiction awards
Awards established in 2012
2012 establishments in Australia
Australian non-fiction book awards
Australian history awards